We Tadra Khonglo (? – 728), also known as We Tara Khonglo, was a general of Tibetan Empire who served as Lönchen during the reign of Me Agtsom. In Chinese records, his name was given as Xīnuòluó Gōnglù.

He invaded Tang China in 727, sank Guazhou (瓜州, in mordern Gansu), Changle (常樂, in south of mordern Guazhou County), Changmenjun (長門軍, in north of mordern Yumen) and Anxi (安西, mordern Lintan). Chinese generals saw him as the biggest threat in the Sino-Tibetan border.

According to the Tibetan Annals, Tadra Khonglo was executed by Me Agtsom in brag mar in 728. According to Old Book of Tang, a Chinese general named Xiao Song had spies create rumors in Tibet that Tadra Khonglo was conspiring with Tang—which Me Agtsom believed, and summoned him then had him killed.

References
Old Tibetan Annals (version I), I.T.J. 0750
Old Tibetan Chronicle, P.T. 1287
New Book of Tang, vol. 230

8th-century Tibetan people
People of the Tibetan Empire
728 deaths
8th-century executions